Greenland Township may refer to one of the following townships in the United States:

Greenland Township, Washington County, Arkansas
Greenland Township, Michigan
Greenland Township, Barnes County, North Dakota

See also 
Greenland (disambiguation)

Township name disambiguation pages